Chichester Alexander Bell (1848–1924) was an American chemist and inventor. He was a first cousin of Alexander Graham Bell, and instrumental in developing improved versions of the phonograph.

Life 

Bell was born in Dublin, Ireland in 1848 to Professor David Charles Bell (1817–1903) and Ellen Adine Highland. David Charles was an elder brother to Professor Alexander Melville Bell, the renowned British authority on elocution and speech.

Bell received his Baccalaurei in Medicinâ degree in Medicine and Surgery from Trinity College, University of Dublin, Ireland, on 30 June 1869. Prior to moving to Washington, D.C. to join his cousin Alexander Graham Bell's Volta Laboratory, Chichester was Assistant Professor of Chemistry, University College London. In 1881 Chichester Bell began working with Alexander and their associate Charles Tainter on addressing the drawbacks to Thomas Edison's phonograph.

The three men created the Volta Laboratory Association to be the holder of their patents. Their successful development of the Graphophone led to the formation of the Volta Graphophone Company of Alexandria, Virginia in February 1886 by the principals, along with Chichester's brother, lawyer and banker, Charles B. Bell (born 1858). While living in Washington, D.C., Chichester Bell was one of the founding members of the Chemical Society Washington Chapter.

He then returned to University College, London to continue his scientific research. In 1887, he published "Sympathetic Vibration of Jets" in the Philosophical Transactions of the Royal Society. Chichester Bell also helped establish the Edison Bell company. The Edison Bell company was established on 30 November 1892 in London to sell phonographs produced by the Edison United Phonograph Company.

Bell was awarded the John Scott Medal of The Franklin Institute in 1900. He married Antoinette Ives in 1889, in Montreal, Quebec, Canada and died at Radcliffe Infirmary, St Giles, Oxford, Oxfordshire, England, on 11 March 1924.

Patents 
 Transmitter for Electric Telephone Lines, filed May 1884, issued February 1886
 Jet Microphone or Apparatus for Transmitting Sounds by Means of Jets, filed May 1884, issued February 1886
 Telephone Transmitter, Filed April 1885, issued February 1886
  Reproducing Sounds from Phonograph Records (without using a stylus or causing wear), filed November 1885, issued May 1886 (with Alexander Bell and Charles Tainter)
  Transmitting And Recording Sounds By Radiant Energy, filed November 1885, issued May 1886 (with Alexander Bell and Charles Tainter)
  Recording and Reproducing Speech and Other Sounds (improvements include compliant cutting head, wax surface, and constant linear velocity disk), filed June 1885, issued May 1886 (with Charles Tainter)

See also 
 Volta Laboratory and Bureau

References

External links 
 Story of the Graphophone

1848 births
1924 deaths
American manufacturing businesspeople
Irish emigrants to the United States (before 1923)
19th-century American inventors
Scientists from Washington, D.C.
Alexander Graham Bell
Scottish chemists